William Quillian is the name of:

William Quillian (tennis) (1934–1973), American tennis player
William H. Quillian (fl. 1975 to present), American literary critic
William F. Quillian, Jr. (died 2014), president of Randolph College